is a passenger railway station operated by the Takamatsu-Kotohira Electric Railroad in Takamatsu, Kagawa, Japan.  It is operated by the private transportation company Takamatsu-Kotohira Electric Railroad (Kotoden) and is designated station "K05".

Lines
Ōta Station is a statin on the Kotoden Kotohira Line and is located 6.2 km from the opposing terminus of the line at Takamatsu-Chikkō Station.

Layout
The station consists of two opposed side platforms connected by a level crossing.

Adjacent stations

History
Ōta Station opened on December 21, 1926 as a station of the Kotohira Electric Railway. On November 1, 1943 it became  a station on the Takamatsu Kotohira Electric Railway Kotohira Line due to a company merger. In April 1987, the station building was relocated 336 meters in the direction of Kotoden Kotohira.

Surrounding area
Kagawa Prefectural Road 147 Ota Uemachi Shido Line
Kagawa Prefectural School for the Deaf
Kagawa Prefectural Takamatsu Sakurai High School

Passenger statistics

See also
 List of railway stations in Japan

References

External links

  

Railway stations in Japan opened in 1926
Railway stations in Takamatsu